Stolzembourg is a village in the commune of Putscheid, in north-eastern Luxembourg.  , the village has a population of 170.

Stolzembourg Castle is located on a hill in the centre of the village. The current building was built on the ruins of the medieval castle in 1898 in the style of a Scottish country house.

The village is also known for the fact that in World War II US troops crossed the border at Stolzembourg into Nazi Germany for the first time. On 11 September 1944 a patrol led by Sgt. Warner W. Holzinger of the 2nd Platoon, Troop B, 85th Cavalry Reconnaissance Squadron, 5th Armored Division, crossed the river Our and reached Keppeshausen.

See also
 List of villages in Luxembourg

References

Putscheid
Villages in Luxembourg